is a private university in Hakusan, Ishikawa, Japan. The predecessor of the school was founded in 1904, and it was chartered as a university in 2000.

External links
 Official website 

Educational institutions established in 1904
Private universities and colleges in Japan
Universities and colleges in Ishikawa Prefecture
1904 establishments in Japan